Kevin Rutkiewicz (born 10 May 1980) is a Scottish professional football player and coach, who is the current manager of Lowland League side East Kilbride. He was formally the manager of Scottish League Two club Stirling Albion. Ruthkiewicz played as a defender for Aberdeen, St Johnstone, Dunfermline Athletic, Greenock Morton, East Fife and American club Carolina RailHawks.

After a stint as player/assistant manager at Annan Athletic, Rutkiewicz was appointed Stirling Albion manager in October 2018. He would announce his resignation in December 2021.

Career
Glasgow born Rutkiewicz began his professional career with Aberdeen, making his debut in an SPL fixture against Hibernian in November 1999 at the age of nineteen. He went on to make almost seventy first-team appearances for the Pittodrie club, scoring his only goal for the club in a 3-2 defeat to Hearts in April 2002.

Rutkiewicz became then St Johnstone manager John Connolly's first signing for the Perth club in June 2004. He scored his first goal for Saints in a 3–0 win over Queen of the South in the league cup two months into his St Johnstone career. He signed a new two-year contract at the end of 2005–06, but missed all of 2006–07 due to an injury. In his first game back, on 11 August 2007, he scored a goal in Saints' 2–2 draw with Stirling Albion at McDiarmid Park.

Rutkiewicz was made club captain in 2008–09 after the previous captain, Kevin James, suffered injury problems and dropped out of the first team. In March 2009 he received the Scottish First Division Player of the Month Award for a string of solid performances that helped the team maintain their lead at the top of the league table.

In January 2011, Rutkiewicz joined Dunfermline on loan. This successful spell at the club led to him being offered a permanent contract for the 2011/12 season, which he accepted. He missed most of the season due to a hip injury. Soon after making a comeback he suffered an ankle injury. He made a second comeback but then immediately suffered a third injury, which ruled him out of action for the rest of the season.

After he was released by Dunfermline in May 2012, and went on trial with Greenock Morton starting in a friendly match against Concordia Chiajna and coming off the bench to replace Martin Hardie in the Renfrewshire Cup final against St Mirren.

He signed for Morton towards the end of July 2012.
In April 2013, Rutkiewicz agreed a two-year player/coach deal with Carolina RailHawks in the North American Soccer League.

In October 2015, Rutkiewicz dropped down to Junior level when he signed for Blantyre Victoria in a player/coach role. He took temporary charge of Vics after the departure of Davie Greig in December 2015 but followed his former manager to Irvine Meadow in January 2016. Rutkiewicz returned to the SPFL tier-system in March 2017, signing a short-term contract with Scottish League Two side Clyde. Rutkiewicz left the club in May 2017 after his contract ended, subsequently signing a deal with Annan Athletic which would see him become player-assistant manager to Peter Murphy.

In October 2018, Rutkiewicz was appointed manager of Scottish League Two club Stirling Albion. In December 2021, Rutkiewicz announced is resignation from the role.

On 28 March 2022, Rutkiewicz was appointed manager of Lowland League side East Kilbride
 Rutkiewicz won the Lowland League Cup with East Kilbride in 2022

Personal life
Rutkiewicz is of Polish descent. His grandfather Ernest was born in Warsaw, but moved to Scotland during the Second World War.

Career statistics

Manager

Honours
St Johnstone
Scottish Challenge Cup: 2007–08

References

External links

 (Clyde; incorrect surname)

1980 births
Aberdeen F.C. players
Association football defenders
Living people
Footballers from Glasgow
Scottish people of Polish descent
Scottish Football League players
Dunfermline Athletic F.C. players
Scottish footballers
Scottish Premier League players
St Johnstone F.C. players
Scottish Junior Football Association players
Larkhall Thistle F.C. players
Greenock Morton F.C. players
East Fife F.C. players
Blantyre Victoria F.C. players
Irvine Meadow XI F.C. players
Clyde F.C. players
Annan Athletic F.C. players
Expatriate soccer players in the United States
Scottish expatriate sportspeople in the United States
Scottish expatriate footballers
North Carolina FC players
North American Soccer League players
Scottish football managers
Stirling Albion F.C. managers
Scottish Professional Football League managers
East Kilbride F.C. managers